The Jebel Serj National Park is a Tunisian national park situated between the delegation of South Siliana in the Siliana Governorate and the delegation of the Oueslatia in the Kairouan Governorate. This park of 6.64 sq mi was established on 29 March 2010 and it's managed by the Tunisian Ministry of Agriculture.

References

National parks of Tunisia
Protected areas established in 2010